This List of Florida Gators men's basketball players in the NBA includes those former Florida Gators who have played in one or more regular season games of the National Basketball Association (NBA). The team was founded in 1915, and represents the university in intercollegiate competition. The University of Florida is a member of the National Collegiate Athletic Association (NCAA) and Southeastern Conference (SEC). The Gators have won two NCAA Men's Division I Basketball Championships in 2006 and 2007. After their college careers, several former Gators have played professionally in the NBA. As of the conclusion of the 2020–21 NBA season, 33 former Florida players have played in the NBA or its predecessor American Basketball Association (ABA).

Nine former Florida players have won the NBA Championships. Vernon Maxwell won the title twice with the Houston Rockets in 1994 and 1995. Udonis Haslem and Jason Williams were part of the Miami Heat starting lineup that won the 2006 NBA title. In 2007, Matt Bonner and James White won the NBA title with the San Antonio Spurs, although White did not play any game in the playoffs. Two-time NCAA champion Corey Brewer won the 2011 NBA title with the Dallas Mavericks. Mike Miller won titles in 2012 and 2013 with the Miami Heat, and David Lee and Marreese Speights won a title in 2015 with the Golden State Warriors.

In the 2007 NBA draft, Al Horford, Corey Brewer, and Joakim Noah were selected with the third, seventh and ninth picks respectively. This marked the first time three players drafted in the top 10 came from the same school. Two other players, Taurean Green, and Chris Richard, were selected in the second round.

List

Notes

See also 

 List of Florida Gators in the WNBA
 List of University of Florida alumni
 List of University of Florida Athletic Hall of Fame members

References
General

Specific

Florida
 
Basketball NBA